Hurst Haven is a  long river in Hailsham, Wealden District, East Sussex, England. Located partly in the Pevensey Levels, Hurst Haven joins Glynleigh Sewer to form the Pevensey Haven.

Course 
Hurst Haven rises in a forest south of Cinderford Lane and flows a southerly course. Turning southwesterly around the neighbourhood of Carters Corner, Hurst Haven flows a southeasterly course into the Pevensey Levels just west of the village of Magham Down. After receiving the waters of Iron Stream, Hurst Haven turns south before curving west and receiving the waters of Down Sewer and Horse Eye Sewer before joining Glynleigh Sewer to form the Pevensey Haven.

Water quality 
Water quality of the river in 2019, according to the Environment Agency, a non-departmental public body sponsored by the United Kingdom's Department for Environment, Food and Rural Affairs:

References

External links 
Photographs of Hurst Haven at Geograph Britain and Ireland

Rivers of East Sussex
Rivers of the Pevensey Levels